Jatta or Jåttå is a surname and clan name. The surname originated from Prince Karapha Yalli Jatta son of Mansa Ali Djata Keita son of Mari Djata I establisher of the Mali Empire. Notable people with the surname include:

Antonio Jatta (1852–1912), Italian politician and lichenologist
Assan Jatta (born 1984), Gambian football striker
Bakery Jatta (born 1998), Gambian footballer
Barbara Jatta (born 1962), Italian art historian
Daniel Laemouahuma Jatta, Jola scholar and musician from Mandinary, Gambia
Fabakary Jatta, member of the Pan-African Parliament from the Gambia
Ousman Rambo Jatta, the Councilor of Old Bakau in Gambia
Paul Jatta (born 1991), Gambian footballer
Sidia Jatta, Gambian politician, academic, and writer
Jatta (novel), fantasy novel for teens with the heroine Princess Jatta 'whose life is not a fairytale'

See also
Jåttå Station, railway station at Jåttå in Stavanger, Norway
Jåttå videregående skole, upper secondary school in Stavanger, Norway
Jatta Ismail Khel, village in the Khyber-Pakhtunkhwa province of Pakistan
Jatta (film), a 2013 Kannada film

Gambian surnames